Jarki may refer to:

 Jarki, Poland, a village near Rojewo
 Jarki, Croatia, a village near Cestica
 Jarki, Badin, a village in Sindh, Pakistan